The fourth season of the American television comedy series How I Met Your Mother premiered on September 22, 2008 and concluded on May 18, 2009. It consisted of 24 episodes, each running approximately 22 minutes in length. CBS broadcast the fourth season on Monday nights at 8:30 pm in the United States. The complete fourth season was released on Region 1 DVD on September 29, 2009. In the United Kingdom it aired on E4.

The fourth season is the only season of How I Met Your Mother to be nominated for the Primetime Emmy Award for Outstanding Comedy Series.

Cast

Main cast
 Josh Radnor as Ted Mosby
 Jason Segel as Marshall Eriksen
 Cobie Smulders as Robin Scherbatsky
 Neil Patrick Harris as Barney Stinson
 Alyson Hannigan as Lily Aldrin
 Bob Saget (uncredited) as Future Ted Mosby (voice only)

Recurring cast
 Sarah Chalke as Stella Zinman
 Lyndsy Fonseca as Penny, Ted's Daughter
 David Henrie as Luke, Ted's Son
 Charlene Amoia as Wendy the Waitress
 Bryan Callen as Bilson
 Jason Jones as Tony Grafanello
 Darcy Rose Byrnes as Lucy Zinman
 Marshall Manesh as Ranjit
 Joe Nieves as Carl, the owner of MacLarens Pub
 Matt Boren as Stuart

Guest cast
 Regis Philbin as himself
 Bill Fagerbakke as Marvin Eriksen, Sr.
 David Burtka as Scooter
 Frances Conroy as Loretta Stinson
 Erin Cahill as Heather Mosby
 Brooke D'Orsay as Margaret (Betty - Barney's Wife)
 Laura Prepon as Karen
Kendra Wilkinson as herself
Kevin Michael Richardson as Stan
Heidi Montag as herself
Spencer Pratt as himself
Kim Kardashian as herself
Will Sasso as Doug Martin

Episodes

U.S. viewership

This season is currently the second highest rated season of How I Met Your Mother in terms of viewership, at an average of 9.42 million viewers. However, it is currently the highest rated in terms of the important Adults 18-49 demographic, which is what advertisers use to determine how much a 30-second advertising spot costs. Season 4 averaged 4.0/10 in terms of rating/share in the Adults 18-49 demographic.

Critical response  
Season 4 received highly positive reviews and is often considered to be the best season of the series. Michelle Zoromski of IGN gave Season 4 an overall rating of 8.5 out of 10. Michelle stated, "This fourth season seemed to settle down the chase for the titular mother. While Ted was busy dating Stella, the gang settled into many stand alone episodes which were every bit as entertaining as episodes devoted to Ted's love life," later going on to say, "A stellar Robin-Marshall episode, titled "Little Minnesota," makes it clear that these two do not get enough screen time together. With Robin homesick and unemployed (and at risk of being deported), this pairing brought out the best Robin Sparkles reference of the season, when Marshall leads a rousing karaoke version of "Let's Go to the Mall!"

References

External links

4
2008 American television seasons
2009 American television seasons